Black Saturday may refer to:

Events

Battles, massacres, and unrest
 Battle of Pinkie Cleugh a 1547 battle fought between the Scottish and the English Royal armies
 Black Saturday (Mau Movement), a 1929 killing of 11 unarmed people by New Zealand police during a Mau demonstration in Samoa
 Black Saturday, a day during the 1942 Battle of Gazala between the German Afrika Korps and British armoured divisions
 Operation Agatha or Black Saturday (1946), British arrests of Jewish paramilitaries
 Cairo Fire or Black Saturday, a 1952 series of riots in Cairo
 Black Saturday (Cuban Missile Crisis), a day in 1962 when tensions reached their height
 Black Saturday or the Wekiduba massacre, the massacre of an Eritrean village by Ethiopian soldiers during the Eritrean War of Independence
 Massacre of the Sixty or Black Saturday, a 1974 execution of 60 senior Ethiopian officials by the country's ruling junta
 Black Saturday (Lebanon) a 1975 series of massacres and armed clashes in Beirut
 Black January or Black Saturday, a 1990 crackdown on Azeri demonstrations by the Soviet army
 12 May Karachi riots or Black Saturday riots, 2007 political riots in Karachi, Pakistan

Natural events
 Black Saturday (1621), a dark, stormy day in Scotland, taken as a sign of Armageddon
 Black Saturday (1988), the worst day of the fires in Yellowstone Park
 Black Saturday bushfires, a 2009 series of bushfires that burned across the Australian state of Victoria

Economic events
 Black Saturday (1900), the collapse of Dumbell's Bank, Isle of Man, leading to numerous bankruptcies and poverty
 Black Saturday (1983), the crisis when the Hong Kong dollar exchange rate was at an all-time low

Other events
 Holy Saturday, the day between Good Friday and Easter Sunday
 Black Saturday (France), the busiest day of the year when many people go on holiday
 Black Saturday (1903), the collapse of a section of balcony during a baseball game between the Boston Braves and Philadelphia Phillies, which killed 12 spectators and injured more than 200
 Black Saturday (professional wrestling), a 1984 event when the World Wrestling Federation took over the TBS television time slots that had been home to Georgia Championship Wrestling

Music
 "Black Saturday", a 2012 song by Soundgarden from King Animal
 "Black Saturday", a 2014 song by Mando Diao from Ælita

See also
 Bloody Saturday (disambiguation)
 Black Sabbath (disambiguation) 
 Black Sunday (disambiguation)
 Bloody Sunday (disambiguation)
 Black mass
 Witches' Sabbath
 Black Friday (disambiguation)
 Bloody Friday (disambiguation)
 Black Monday
 Bloody Monday (disambiguation)
 Black Tuesday (disambiguation)
 Bloody Tuesday (disambiguation)
 Black Wednesday (disambiguation)
 Bloody Wednesday (disambiguation)
 Black Thursday
 Bloody Thursday (disambiguation)

Black days